Abuaihuda Ozon (born 1 September 1959) is a Syrian weightlifter. He competed in the men's heavyweight II event at the 1984 Summer Olympics.

References

1959 births
Living people
Syrian male weightlifters
Olympic weightlifters of Syria
Weightlifters at the 1984 Summer Olympics
Place of birth missing (living people)